The following are the national records in athletics in Comoros maintained by Comoros' national athletics federation: Fédération Comorienne d'Athlétisme (FCA).

Outdoor

Key to tables:

h = hand timing

a = automatic timing

Men

Women

Indoor

Men

Women

References
General
World Athletics Statistic Handbook 2019: National Outdoor Records
World Athletics Statistic Handbook 2018: National Indoor Records
Specific

External links

Comoros
Records
Athletics